form Japan's second-largest community of foreign residents ahead of Koreans in Japan and behind Chinese in Japan, according to the statistics of the Ministry of Justice. By in June 2022, there were 476,346 residents. The majority of the Vietnamese legal residents live in the Kantō region and Keihanshin area.

Migration history 

Large numbers of Vietnamese students began to choose Japan as a destination in the early 20th century, spurred by the exiled prince Cường Để and the Đông Du Movement (literally, "Travel East movement" or "Eastern Travel movement") he and Phan Bội Châu pioneered. By 1908, 200 Vietnamese students had gone to study at Japanese universities. However, the community of Vietnamese people in Japan is dominated by Vietnam War refugees and their families, who compose about 70% of the total population. Japan began to accept refugees from Vietnam in the late 1970s. The policy of accepting foreign migrants marked a significant break from Japan's post-World War II orientation towards promoting and maintaining racial homogeneity. Most of these migrants settled in Kanagawa and Hyōgo prefectures, the locations of the initial resettlement centres. As they moved out of the resettlement centres, they often gravitated to Zainichi Korean-dominated neighbourhoods; however, they feel little sense of community with Zainichi Koreans, seeing them not as fellow ethnic minorities but as part of the mainstream.

Guest workers began to follow the refugees to Japan in the so-called "third wave" of Vietnamese migration beginning in the 1990s. As contract workers returned home to Vietnam from the countries of the former Eastern Bloc, which by then had begun their transition away from Communism, they began to look for other foreign destinations in which they could earn good incomes, and Japan proved attractive due to its nearby location and high standard of living. By the end of 1994, the annual number of Vietnamese workers going to Japan totalled 14,305 individuals, mostly under industrial traineeship visas. In contrast to other labour-exporting countries in Southeast Asia, the vast majority of migrants were men, due to the Vietnamese government's restrictions on migration for work in traditionally female-dominated fields such as domestic work or entertainment.

During the COVID-19 pandemic travel between Japan and Vietnam was restricted temporarily halting migration.

Integration
The refugees have suffered various difficulties adjusting to Japanese society, especially in the areas of education and employment; their attendance rate in senior high school is estimated to be only 40%, as compared to 96.6% for Japanese nationals, a fact attributed both to the refugees' lack of Japanese language proficiency as well as the schools' own inability to adjust to the challenges of educating students with different cultural backgrounds. Tensions have also arisen between migrants admitted to Japan as adults, and 1.5 or 2nd-generation children born or educated in Japan, due to language barriers and differences in culture; the former feel the latter are too reserved and distant, while the latter deride the former for their poor Japanese language skills. Most Vietnamese do not take on Japanese names, or prefer to use their Vietnamese names even if they have a Japanese name, though they feel a Japanese name may be necessary for job-seeking and they sometimes complain of being teased for having "katakana names".  Catholic churches quickly came to play an important role in their community.

Notable individuals 
Cường Để, Vietnamese revolutionary and royal relative of Nguyễn
Phong Chi, female idol (Vietnamese parents, raised in Japan)
Jun Nguyen-Hatsushiba, artist (Vietnamese father)
Yūki Tai, voice actor (Vietnamese/Japanese parent)
Masato Seto, Japanese Thai photographer (Born to a Thai mother of Vietnamese descent and a Japanese father)

See also
 Ethnic groups of Japan

References

Further reading
 
 
 

Ethnic groups in Japan
Japan, Vietnamese people in
Japan
 
 
Asian diaspora in Japan